Beati i ricchi (Blessed Are the Rich) is a 1972 Italian comedy film written and directed by Salvatore Samperi.

Cast 

 Paolo Villaggio as Augusto
 Lino Toffolo as Geremia
 Sylva Koscina as the Countess 
 Piero Vida as the Priest
 Eugene Walter as the Mayor
 Enzo Robutti as Bank Manager
 Gigi Ballista as the Commendatore
 Neda Arnerić as Miss Barti
 Enrica Bonaccorti as Adele
 Olga Bisera

References

External links

1972 films
Italian comedy films
1972 comedy films
Films directed by Salvatore Samperi
Films scored by Luis Bacalov
1970s Italian-language films
1970s Italian films